Verkhniye Kolki is a rural locality (a selo) in Bolshemogoysky Selsoviet of Volodarsky District, Astrakhan Oblast, Russia. The population was 41 as of 2010. There is 1 street.

Geography 
Verkhniye Kolki is located 30 km southeast of Volodarsky (the district's administrative centre) by road. Churkin is the nearest rural locality.

References 

Rural localities in Volodarsky District, Astrakhan Oblast